Ahmed Al-Qadri (1956 – 3 September 2020) was a Syrian agricultural engineer and politician. He held the position of Minister of Agriculture and Agrarian Reform from February 2013 until August 2020 within the Council of Ministers, or cabinet, of Prime Ministers Wael Nader al-Halqi and Imad Khamis.

Al-Qadri died from COVID-19 during the COVID-19 pandemic in Syria, at Al Assad University Hospital in Damascus on 3 September 2020. He was the first Syrian government official to die from COVID-19 during the pandemic in Syria.

References

1956 births
2020 deaths
Agricultural engineers
Agriculture ministers of Syria
Arab Socialist Ba'ath Party – Syria Region politicians
People from Al-Hasakah Governorate
Deaths from the COVID-19 pandemic in Syria